Gemeinde Sylt is a municipality on the island of Sylt in the district of Nordfriesland, in Schleswig-Holstein, Germany. It has around 13,000 inhabitants and covers about 60% of the area of the island.

History
The municipality was formed on 1 January 2009 by the merger of the former municipalities Rantum and Sylt-Ost with the town of Westerland. The debate on this move had started in 2003 when a similar merger happened on Fehmarn. However, local rivalries and desire for independence prevented progress for a time. It took the foundation of a citizens' movement Bürger für Sylt als Einheit to advance the plan. In separate referendums in 2008, Westerland (by a large majority) and Sylt-Ost (narrowly) agreed to the merger in May 2008. Rantum followed, but List, Kampen, Wenningstedt-Braderup and Hörnum remained aloof. In September 2008 the merger contract was signed.

Although Westerland used to have the status of Stadt (town), the new municipality so far refrained from applying for this status. One reason is that the Ortsteile do not want to advertise their tourism services as simple suburbs (Stadtteile).

Geography

Subdivision
The municipality consists of the following Ortsteile (towns):

 Archsum*
 Keitum*
 Morsum*
 Munkmarsch*
 Rantum
 Tinnum*
 Westerland

(* Former constituent part of Sylt-Ost.)

Government
Gemeinde Sylt shares its administration in a Verwaltungsgemeinschaft with the Amt Landschaft Sylt, located in the townhall of Westerland – the former Kurhaus, built in 1897.

Municipal council
The Gemeindevertretung Sylt has  36 members. Since the election of 26 May 2013 the distribution has been as follows:
CDU: 14 seats
 Sylter Wählergemeinschaft: 7 seats
SPD: 6 seats
The Greens: 3 seats
 SSW: 3 seats
 Insel-Liste zukunft.sylt: 2 seats
 Independent: 1 seat

Mayor
In January 2015, Nikolas Häckel was elected as new mayor in the second round of voting which he won with 55% of the vote (against 45% for Gabriele Pauli). He replaced incumbent Petra Reiber (in office since 2009) on 1 May 2015.

References

External links

 Sylt official website

Sylt
Nordfriesland